In enzymology, an (S)-2-hydroxy-acid oxidase is an enzyme that catalyzes the chemical reaction

(S)-2-hydroxy acid + O  2-oxo acid + HO

Thus, the two substrates of this enzyme are (S)-2-hydroxy acid and O, whereas its two products are 2-oxo acid and HO.

This enzyme belongs to the family of oxidoreductases, specifically those acting on the CH-OH group of donor with oxygen as acceptor.  The systematic name of this enzyme class is (S)-2-hydroxy-acid:oxygen 2-oxidoreductase. Other names in common use include glycolate oxidase, hydroxy-acid oxidase A, hydroxy-acid oxidase B, oxidase, L-2-hydroxy acid, hydroxyacid oxidase A, L-alpha-hydroxy acid oxidase, and L-2-hydroxy acid oxidase.  This enzyme participates in glyoxylate and dicarboxylate metabolism.  It employs one cofactor, FMN.

Structural studies

References

 
 
 
 
 
 
 
 

EC 1.1.3
Flavoproteins
Enzymes of known structure